Ecbletodes is a genus of snout moths. It was described by Alfred Jefferis Turner in 1904, and contains the species E. psephenias. It is found in Australia.

References

Phycitini
Monotypic moth genera
Pyralidae genera